Carbon is a village in central Alberta, Canada.

Built at the beginning of the 20th century in the Kneehill Creek Valley, Carbon is a village with paved, quiet streets lined with trees.

History 
The Carbon district has a very colorful and interesting history. Ranching, farming and coal mining were the major activities of the early settlers. The name Carbon was suggested by L.D. Elliot, an area rancher, and was adopted for the new post office opened on October 1, 1904.  The village was incorporated in 1912.

Carbon had a railroad running through it which has since been removed. This railroad is on the south side of the Kneehill Creek. On both sides of the village (west/east) you can still see this railroad flying over (2016). This railroad was operated by CP rail. Glenbow museum in Calgary has photos of this railroad under construction on file. This railroad was primarily used to support the coal mining in the area.

Demographics 

The population of the Village of Carbon according to its 2017 municipal census is 500.

In the 2016 Census of Population conducted by Statistics Canada, the Village of Carbon recorded a population of 500 living in 199 of its 222 total private dwellings, a  change from its 2011 population of 592.

Facilities and amenities 
The village also features a K-9 school, swimming pool, museum and art gallery, curling rink, and two campgrounds. Maintained walking paths are also available year-round following the creek through the valley.

Notable people
Archie Gouldie, professional wrestler better known by his ring name Mongolian Stomper

See also 
List of communities in Alberta
List of villages in Alberta
Archie Gouldie

References

External links 

1912 establishments in Alberta
Kneehill County
Villages in Alberta